Lateral brachial cutaneous nerve can refer to:

 Superior lateral cutaneous nerve of arm
 Inferior lateral cutaneous nerve of arm